The Indigenous Voices Awards are a Canadian literary award program, created in 2017 to honour indigenous literatures in Canada. It is administered by the Indigenous Literary Studies Association, a non-profit organization that promotes the production, study and teaching of Indigenous literatures. 

The awards grew out of a 2017 controversy, when a group of Canadian writers were criticized for campaigning on Twitter in favour of a prize supporting cultural appropriation. In response, Toronto lawyer Robin Parker launched a crowdfunding campaign to create a new prize for First Nations, Métis and Inuit writers in Canada. The crowdfunding campaign was set with a goal of $10,000, but ultimately attracted over $140,000 in donations.  

The awards honour both published and unpublished work by Indigenous writers in Indigenous languages, English and French. The first winners were announced in May 2018. On National Indigenous Peoples Day, June 21, 2022, IVA announced that an anthology of selected works by the finalists will be published by Penguin Random House Canada in 2023 to celebrate the 5th anniversary of the award.

Recipients

See also
 Burt Award for First Nations, Inuit and Métis Literature
 PMC Indigenous Literature Awards
 McNally Robinson Aboriginal Book of the Year Award

References

Canadian fiction awards
First Nations literary awards
2017 establishments in Canada
Awards established in 2017
Inuit literature
Canadian poetry awards

External links